Niedźwiedź  is a village in the administrative district of Gmina Kikół, within Lipno County, Kuyavian-Pomeranian Voivodeship, in north-central Poland. It lies approximately 7 km northwest of Kikół, 15 km northwest of Lipno, and 30 km east of Toruń.

References

Villages in Lipno County